Pandit Niladri Kumar  is an Indian sitar player and music composer.

Early life
He was born to sitar player Kartick Kumar, a disciple of Ravi Shankar. He started learning sitar under his father at the age of four. Kumar gave his first public performance at the age of six at Sri Aurobindo Ashram in Pondicherry.

Career
 He was  a  part of the Masters of the Percussion tour alongside Zakir Hussain. Kumar has also worked with Jonas Hellborg and V. Selvaganesh on their album Kali's Son and with John McLaughlin on album Floating Point. Kumar has also worked with various music directors in Hindi cinema, including A.R. Rahman, Shankar–Ehsaan–Loy and Pritam. Niladri was conferred the Sangeet Natak Akademi's Ustad Bismillah Khan Yuva Puraskar, awarded to young musicians, in March 2007. Niladri has also won MTV Immies award for the Best Classical/Fusion Instrumental for his album If.
 The concept initiated from a traveling sitar, which was modified by Kumar to create rock guitar sound out of it. Kumar reduced the number of strings on the instrument from 20 to five. He also added an electric pickup inside the instrument so that it would sound more like a guitar. His first full album composed using the instrument, titled Zitar, was released in 2008. Kumar wrote the first track for the album Priority in 2003. Over the next five years he improved the track and subsequent track by gauging audience reaction during live performances. He improvised the tracks adding components from various genres such as rock, electronic and lounge. He also won the MN Mathur Award in the 51st Maharana Kumbha Sangeet Samaroh for his contribution to Indian classical music in March, 2013.

Discography

Albums
2001: Together 
2002: Revelation 
2003: Dharohar
2003: Saanjh Sur
2003: If: Magical Sounds of Sitar
2005: Sitar Gaze
2005: Yoga Lounge (With Chinmaya Dunster)
2006: Forever
2006: De-Stress Revive (With Rupak Kulkarni)
2007: Chillout Forever
2007: Faith
2008: Zitar
2009: Priority
2011: Together (With Talvin Singh)
2013: Plucked
2014: Sur Yajna

Films
Bunty Aur Babli - Chup Chup Ke (Sitar)
Gangster - Na Jaane Koi (Zitar)
Omkara - Naina thag lenge (Sitar)
Life in a... Metro - Alvida (Zitar)
Life in a... Metro -  In DIno (Zitar)
Dhoom 2 - Crazy Kiya Re (Zitar)
Dabangg 2 - Tore naina bade dagabaaz re (Sitar)
Maazii - Mora Jiya (Zitar)
Desi Boyz - Make Some Noise (Zitar)
Paheli - Dheere Jalna (Sitar)
7 Khoon Maaf - Aawara (Sitar)
My Name Is Khan - Tere Naina (Sitar)
Kalank- Ghar More Pardesiya (Sitar)
Baahubali: The Beginning - Manohari (Sitar)
Aashiqui 2 – Sunn Raha Hai (Sitar)
Laila Majnu
Kalank - Ghar more pardesiya
Dr. Arora - Mehram (Song Composer)
Dr. Arora - Khaalipan (Song Composer)

Music direction 
Shorgul (Tere Bina) - Hindi Movie (2016)
Niruttara - Kannada Movie (2016)
Laila Majnu - Hindi Movie (2018)

Awards and nominations

References

External links

Hindustani instrumentalists
Indian male composers
Sitar players
Living people
1973 births